Laura Palmer EP is the debut EP by English indie pop band Bastille, self-released in November 2011 as a digital download and on CD. It features four of Bastille's earliest songs, which were later included on their debut album Bad Blood. It followed their debut single "Flaws" / "Icarus", which was released on 4 July 2011.

Track listing
All songs written and composed by Dan Smith

References

External links
 Laura Palmer EP | Bastille

2011 debut EPs
Indie pop EPs
Bastille (band) albums